Streptomyces phaeoluteichromatogenes is a bacterium species from the genus of Streptomyces.

See also 
 List of Streptomyces species

References

Further reading

External links
Type strain of Streptomyces phaeoluteichromatogenes at BacDive -  the Bacterial Diversity Metadatabase	

phaeoluteichromatogenes
Bacteria described in 2008